Geitodoris joubini is a species of sea slug or dorid nudibranch, a marine gastropod mollusc in the family Discodorididae.

Distribution

Description

Ecology

References

Discodorididae
Gastropods described in 1919